John Newsom (born 1970 in Hutchinson, Kansas) is an American painter best known for his thickly layered, gestural paintings of pastoral flora and fauna subject matter.

Early life and education

Newsom grew up in Kansas and Oklahoma. He completed high school in 1988 at the prestigious 
Interlochen Arts Academy located in northern Michigan. In 1992 he completed his Bachelor of Fine Arts degree at the Rhode Island School of Design  and subsequently moved to New York City, where he attended New York University’s studio arts program. He graduated with a Master of Fine Arts degree from NYU at the age of 24. He has lived and worked in New York City for the past thirty years.

Career

Painting
Newsom is best known for combining  multiple techniques of formal painting strategies onto large canvases, featuring dynamic spectacles of the natural world. His paintings are created by overlapping coats of heavy oil paint which give rise to a highly gestural and intuitive formal vocabulary. Evenly toned backgrounds of color are juxtaposed with expressionistic splashes of white oil paint.  In an added surface, Newsom paints recurrent monochromatic geometric shapes such as squares or circles in a hard-edge manner. He then renders the subject matter with a densely thick layering of various brushstrokes. Newsom consistently paints a wide variety of animals and flora.  His reduced subject matter and calligraphic style, has been compared to the works of Philip Guston, for the reason that by focusing on a limited, but meaningful subject matter, an individual technique matures.  Moreover, Newsom’s work has been interpreted as allegorical still lifes that capture the essence of Darwinism: "The tradition of the great naturalists – creating works of art that explore the complex relationships in nature."

However, Newsom’s oeuvre is not only inspired by the thoughts and musings of Charles Darwin, but also by the artwork of the early French-American watercolorist John James Audubon. The momentous color-plate book by Audubon, The Birds of America, (1827 – 1839) features detailed studies of birds in their habitats, and promoted the discipline of ornithology throughout the United States. Equally so, Newsom is concerned with what the art critic Robert C. Morgan called "veritable exegesis on survival and pathology."

In addition, notable formal influences are identified in Newsom’s first monograph of mature work, 'Allegories of Naturalism' (2003-2010), published by CHARTA in Milan in 2010. Henri Matisse, whose bold colors and "formalist strategy of allover composition" is named. Newsom's signature white splashes are also noted, which call to mind Jackson Pollock’s drip paintings. His most recent works present iconic close-ups of owls rendered in a dense impasto buildup of black and white oil paint. In August 2012, Newsom was ranked 47th among the Top 100 contemporary artists by Flash Art Magazine.

His work is represented by MARC STRAUS in New York, and Patrick Painter Inc. in Los Angeles.

Curatorial practice

In addition to his painting practice, John Newsom is an active curator and writer. In 2011 he curated the exhibition 'CIRCA 1986' at the Hudson Valley Center for Contemporary Art (with Nicola Trezzi and Astrid Honold). In 2008, he curated and wrote the accompanying catalogue essay  for 'Markus Lüpertz: Tent Paintings 1965', held at Patrick Painter Inc. in Los Angeles, CA.

Personal life

Newsom lives in Brooklyn, New York with his wife Cassie Newsom and their two children Luke and Ruby Newsom.

Recent solo exhibitions

2023

Universal Frontier, Mark Arts Center, Wichita, KS (forthcoming)

2022 

Nature’s Course, Oklahoma Contemporary Museum & Arts Center, Oklahoma City, OK (cat.)

Classical Elements, COUNTY, Palm Beach, FL (two-artist exhibition with
Raymond Pettibon) (cat.)

2019 

Eye of the Beholder, Contra Gallery, Ljubljana, Slovenia

2018 

Shangri-La, Brintz Gallery, Palm Beach, FL (cat.)

2016 

Patrick Painter Inc., Los Angeles, CA (West Gallery) (two-artist exhibition with
Rinus Van De Velde)

2015 

Marc Straus Gallery, New York, NY (cat.)

Rogue Arena, MANA Contemporary, Jersey City, NJ (cat.)

2013 

Bestiary, Marc Straus Gallery, New York, NY

2011-2012 

Crescendo, The Richard J. Massey Foundation for the Arts and Sciences, New York, NY (cat.)

2011 

Nocturne Paintings, Patrick Painter Inc., Los Angeles, CA (cat.)

Motifs and Methods, Patrick Painter Inc., Los Angeles, CA (cat.)

2009 

Beyond the Horizon, Patrick Painter Inc., Los Angeles, CA 

Rebels and Raptors, Lattuada Gallery, Milan, Italy (cat.)

Publications

2015 

John Newsom: Paintings and Works on Paper 2012-2015, New York: Marc Straus Gallery.

2011 

John Newsom: Crescendo, Milan: Charta. 

2010 

John Newsom: Allegories of Naturalism, Milan: Charta.

References

External links
 http://johnnewsom.info/

Living people
1970 births